Aldo Mauricio Martínez Hernández (born 16 March 1980) is a Mexican politician affiliated with the Institutional Revolutionary Party.  he served as Deputy of the LIX Legislature of the Mexican Congress representing Coahuila as replacement of Fernando de las Fuentes.

References

1980 births
Living people
Politicians from Coahuila
Institutional Revolutionary Party politicians
Autonomous University of Coahuila alumni
21st-century Mexican politicians
Deputies of the LIX Legislature of Mexico
Members of the Chamber of Deputies (Mexico) for Coahuila